"Am I Wrong" is a song by Norwegian musical duo Nico & Vinz (previously known as Envy). Produced by William Wiik Larsen ("Will IDAP"), the song was initially released as a digital download single in Norway on 12 April 2013, credited to the duo's previous name Envy, and became a hit in various Nordic countries, including Norway, Sweden, Denmark and Finland.

Upon being released internationally, and following the duo's name change to Nico & Vinz, the song attained commercial success in various other countries, reaching number one in Canada, New Zealand, the United Kingdom and the top five in Australia and the United States, among other nations.

Background
During an interview on Good Morning America, when asked about the meaning of the song and what inspired them to make it, Nico Sereba said: "Inspiration is coming from a small country, but having huge dreams and people telling you, man, that's not realistic, come on, you can't be on the top of America or the top of the world or whatever we dream of."

Release
"Am I Wrong" was originally released on 12 April 2013, following the moderately successful singles under their name Envy "Set to Go" (2010), "One Song" (2011) and "Go Loud" (2012) and their name change to Nico & Vinz by the end of 2012 to avoid being confused with other artists with a similar name.

Critical reception
Jason Lipshutz of Billboard wrote that while "lines like 'Am I wrong/For trying to reach the things that I can't see?' [are sung] with dead-eyed earnestness... the slide guitar and backing harmonies keep the song an airy affair."

Commercial performance
Envy's "Am I Wrong" charted in Norway, Sweden, Denmark and Finland and was credited as such in the charts of those countries. The single peaked at number two in Norway in June 2013 and in Denmark and Sweden in August 2013, and at number five in Finland in November 2013.

Following the success of the single in the Scandinavian countries and the duo's name change to Nico & Vinz, the song entered several other international singles charts. In the United States, the song peaked at number four on the Billboard Hot 100, becoming the highest-charting song by a Norwegian artist since a-ha's "Take On Me" in 1985. The song reached its first million sales mark in the US in June 2014, and its second million in September 2014, having sold 2.2 million by the year's end. In the United Kingdom, the song peaked at number one, making Nico & Vinz the first Norwegian act to top the UK Singles Chart since a-ha's "The Sun Always Shines on T.V." in 1986.

Music video
A music video to accompany the release of "Am I Wrong" was first released onto YouTube on 21 June 2013 at a total length of five minutes and five seconds. The video was directed and edited by Kavar Singh. The video takes place in Africa – namely Maun in Botswana as well as Victoria Falls in Zimbabwe and Zambia – where the duo walk around with a TV each, trying to find a signal to locate the other. According to the band, it was put together in an effort to present a positive side of Africa, with the continent too often mired in negative news stories.

Cover versions
In 2015, Lower Than Atlantis released a Live Lounge performance of the song on the 2015 reissue of their self-titled album.
In 2021, it was part of the Cinderella movie.

Track listings
 Digital download
 "Am I Wrong" – 4:07

 CD single (Germany)
 "Am I Wrong" – 4:08
 "Am I Wrong"  – 4:06

Charts

Weekly charts

Year-end charts

Certifications

Release history

See also
 List of number-one singles from the 2010s (New Zealand)
 List of Billboard Adult Contemporary number ones of 2014

Notes

References

2013 songs
2013 singles
Nico & Vinz songs
Number-one singles in Israel
Number-one singles in New Zealand
Number-one singles in Poland
Number-one singles in Russia
Number-one singles in Slovakia
Canadian Hot 100 number-one singles
Dutch Top 40 number-one singles
UK Singles Chart number-one singles
Songs written by William Wiik Larsen